The Izhma is a river in the Komi Republic of Russia. It is a left tributary of the Pechora. The river freezes over in November, and stays icebound until the spring thaw starts in May.

Main tributaries are the Ukhta, Ayuva and Sebys.

The Izhma has its sources in the Timan Ridge. In its upper course the banks are wooded, while its lower parts is characterized by meadows and bogs. The river is twisting, and in its upper reaches it forms rapids and rocky stretches. At its confluence with the Ukhta lies the town of Sosnogorsk.

The Izhma is navigable to its confluence with the Ukhta. In its lower parts the river widens, its flow slows down and it starts forming meanders and small islands. It flows into the Pechora at Ust-Izhma.

References
 

Rivers of the Komi Republic